Zellwood is a census-designated place and an unincorporated area in Orange County, Florida, United States. The population was 2,817 at the 2010 census. It is part of the Orlando–Kissimmee Metropolitan Statistical Area.

Geography
Zellwood is located at  (28.723839, −81.593219).

According to the United States Census Bureau, the CDP has a total area of 10.5 km (4.1 mi2), of which 10.1 km (3.9 mi2) is land and 0.5 km (0.2 mi2) (4.42%) is water.

Demographics

As of the census of 2000, there were 2,540 people, 1,239 households, and 795 families residing in the CDP.  The population density was 252.1/km (653.3/mi2).  There were 1,409 housing units at an average density of 139.9/km (362.4/mi2).  The racial makeup of the CDP was 93.62% White, 2.83% African American, 0.31% Native American, 0.04% Asian, 2.09% from other races, and 1.10% from two or more races. Hispanic or Latino of any race were 9.09% of the population.

There were 1,239 households, out of which 9.5% had children under the age of 18 living with them, 55.8% were married couples living together, 5.6% had a female householder with no husband present, and 35.8% were non-families. 32.1% of all households were made up of individuals, and 23.8% had someone living alone who was 65 years of age or older.  The average household size was 2.00 and the average family size was 2.43.

In the CDP, the population was spread out, with 11.1% under the age of 18, 3.8% from 18 to 24, 15.4% from 25 to 44, 21.0% from 45 to 64, and 48.7% who were 65 years of age or older.  The median age was 64 years. For every 100 females, there were 86.5 males.  For every 100 females age 18 and over, there were 84.6 males.

The median income for a household in the CDP was $29,300, and the median income for a family was $34,468. Males had a median income of $24,091 versus $20,378 for females. The per capita income for the CDP was $22,683.  About 6.6% of families and 11.9% of the population were below the poverty line, including 23.8% of those under age 18 and 4.2% of those age 65 or over.

History
Zellwood is named after T. Ellwood Zell, who started spending winters in the area in 1876. The Zellwood Post Office opened in 1877

References

Unincorporated communities in Orange County, Florida
Census-designated places in Orange County, Florida
Greater Orlando
Census-designated places in Florida
Unincorporated communities in Florida